Răzvan Andrei Cojanu (born 10 March 1987) is a Romanian professional boxer. As an amateur he represented Romania at the 2009 Jeux de la Francophonie, winning a gold medal in the super-heavyweight division; he also represented Romania at the European Union Championships, winning bronze. His knockout-to-win ratio stands at 56.3%. Cojanu was the first Romanian that fought to win a world heavyweight title.

Professional career

Cojanu vs Parker
Speculation grew that Cojanu would be the replacement opponent for Joseph Parker's first world title defence after the controversial withdrawal of Hughie Fury. Cojanu was involved in Parker's training camp in Las Vegas for the aborted fight with Fury. WBC champion Deontay Wilder also called out Parker for a unification bout while Fury's cousin Tyson, the troubled former champion, said he'd be willing to jump in the ring. Parker was determined to make a statement but couldn't manage that as he left his New Zealand campaign in a convincing unanimous decision. Parker out-pointed Cojanu in the first defence of his world heavyweight title. The judges scored it 119–108, 117–110, and 117–110 in a fight where Cojanu taunted him repeatedly. American referee Mike Ortega deducted a point against Cojanu in the fourth round due to repeatedly pushing down the neck of Parker during the clinches. Parker later admitted he had problems connecting against Cojanu. But Parker's ability to keep disciplined in a fight that involved trash talk, flying elbows, clinches and head holds got him the win comfortably. After the fight, Parker said, "You can all see why we bring Răzvan into camp, we look for the best." This was said as praise, as Cojanu previously worked with Parker as a sparring partner.

Professional boxing record

References

External links

2008 Romanian National Championships
2009 Romanian National Championships

1987 births
Living people
Romanian male boxers
Heavyweight boxers